Microphysogobio longidorsalis is a species of cyprinid fish endemic to South Korea.

References

Microphysogobio
Fish described in 1935